Blackbird Sessions is the fifth release overall and fourth extended play by American country music singer Jessie James Decker. The EP was released on June 9, 2017 through Epic Records. The collection was recorded at the titular Blackbird Studios and comprises four live cover versions of popular songs as well as a live re-recording of "Girl on the Coast" from Decker's previous EP, Gold (2017).

Background

On January 5, 2017 Jessie started releasing live versions of her songs and cover songs recorded in Blackbird Studios starting with "Baby It's Cold Outside"  then she released "Lights Down Low" on January 24, 2017 On February 14, 2017 she released "You're Still the One"  followed by "Girl On the Coast" on March 2, 2017 On March 7, 2017 she released "Love On The Brain"  followed by "Blue Ain't Your Color" on May 13, 2017  which differs a bit from the released EP version.  On May 20, 2017 she released "Too Young to Know"   followed by the last track to be released on the EP "Who's Lovin You"   on May 27, 2017.  On June 3, 2017 she released "Shoot Out the Lights"  followed up by "Gold" on June 17, 2017

Track listing

Chart positions

References

External links

2017 EPs
Jessie James Decker EPs
Epic Records EPs
2017 live albums
Live EPs